Poplar Farm Meadows, Langley is a  biological Site of Special Scientific Interest east of Loddon in Norfolk. It is part of the Broadland Ramsar site and Special Protection Area, and The Broads Special Area of Conservation.

This calcareous fen on the edge of the flood plain of the River Yare is spring fed. It is managed by light summer grazing and the flora is diverse, with some uncommon species. There are also areas of tall fen and the site is crossed by dykes which have clear spring water and a variety of aquatic plants.

The site is private land with no public access.

References

Sites of Special Scientific Interest in Norfolk
Ramsar sites in England
Special Protection Areas in England
Special Areas of Conservation in England